Chlorine is a 2015 drama film written and directed  by Lamberto Sanfelice and starring Sara Serraiocco. It was entered into the World Cinema Dramatic competition at the 2015 Sundance Film Festival. Sanfelice was nominated for Best New Director at the 2015 David di Donatello Awards.

Plot 

Girl, who dreams to be a synchronized swimmer, puts her training on hold when she has to take care of her little brother and sick father after her mother suddenly dies.

Cast 
 Sara Serraiocco as Jenny
 Piera Degli Esposti as Preside
 Giorgio Colangeli as Tondino
 Ivan Franek as  Ivan
  Anatol Sassi as  Fabrizio
  Andrea Vergoni as Alfio

See also 
 List of Italian films of 2015

References

External links 
 
 
2015 drama films
2015 films
Italian drama films
2010s Italian films